William Tidball (born 22 April 2000) is a British road and track cyclist, who currently rides for UCI Continental team .

Career
At the 2022 British National Track Championships in Newport, Wales he won a British title after winning the scratch event.

Tidball won his second national title at the 2023 British Cycling National Track Championships, he won the Team Pursuit for the first time, as part of the Saint Piran team.

Major results

2017
 3rd Madison, National Track Championships
2018
 1st  Madison (with Ethan Vernon), National Junior Track Championships
 3rd Team pursuit, London, 2018–19 UCI Track World Cup
 7th Kuurne–Brussels–Kuurne Juniors
2019
 National Track Championships
2nd Team pursuit
3rd Scratch
2021
 UEC European Under-23 Track Championships
1st  Madison (with Rhys Britton)
2nd  Team pursuit
3rd  Elimination
 3rd  Team pursuit, UEC European Track Championships
 3rd Scratch, UCI Track Champions League, London
2022
 UEC European Under-23 Track Championships
1st  Scratch
2nd  Madison (with Sam Watson)
 1st  Scratch, National Track Championships
 3rd  Team pursuit, UEC European Track Championships
 6th Youngster Coast Challenge
2023
 National Track Championships
1st  Team pursuit
2nd Points race
 UCI Track Nations Cup
1st Elimination, Cairo
3rd Team pursuit, Jakarta

External links

References

2000 births
Living people
British male cyclists
British track cyclists
English track cyclists
People from Exmouth
21st-century British people